The name Hagibis has been used to name four tropical cyclones in the western north Pacific Ocean. The name was contributed by the Philippines and means "rapidity", "swiftness", or "the sound or sensation perceived when something (e.g. car, wind) passes by rapidly."

 Typhoon Hagibis (2002) (T0203, 05W)- Category 5 super typhoon that never affected land
 Typhoon Hagibis (2007) (T0724, 23W, Lando) – traversed the Philippines twice
 Tropical Storm Hagibis (2014) (T1407, 07W) – made landfall over southern China
 Typhoon Hagibis (2019) (T1919, 20W) – long-lived and violent Category 5 super typhoon that caused widespread destruction in Japan

The name Hagibis was retired following the 2019 typhoon season, and replaced with Ragasa, a Filipino word for "sudden quickening movement".

References

Pacific typhoon set index articles